Owen O'Moriarty (Irish:Eoin Ó Muircheartaigh) was a Gaelic Irish warrior and chieftain notable for his part in the final stages of the Desmond Rebellion and the death of Gerald FitzGerald, 15th Earl of Desmond in 1583.

The Moriartys are a noble Gaelic clan who since ancient times inhabited the middle and west of Kerry. The head of the clan in 1583 was Owen O'Moriarty, also known as Owen McDonnell Moriarty. The Moriartys' property at one time stretched from Loch Lein to the Blasket Islands and they were direct descendants of the Eoghanacht. Moriartys were also closely related to the Earl of Desmond and also the O'Donoghues and Ferriters. The clan's principal castle was at Castledrum near Castlemaine, County Kerry. Following a series of defeats and a sustained campaign against his forces, the Earl of Desmond had gone into hiding in western Kerry. In November 1583 a raiding party of Desmond's men attacked a kinsman of the O'Moriartys, stealing their cattle and robbing women and children and stripping them naked.

Owen Moriarty sought assistance from a local Royal commander, Sir William Stanley, to take revenge and recover the cattle. Accompanied by several government soldiers, a party of warriors led by Owen pursued Desmond into the Slieve Mish Mountains. They discovered the Earl sheltering without any guards in a cabin. O'Moriarty attempted to take Desmond prisoner, seizing him and arresting him in the name of the Queen and the Lord General Ormond. However fearing that some of Desmond's men were approaching, they cut off the Earl's head and abandoned the remainder of his body. The reward paid out for Desmond's head by the government was a thousand pounds. Owen Moriarty's account of the incident is still retained in the state papers. 

In 1652 Castledrum was destroyed by Cromwellian forces, and one son of the family escaped to Ballintermon, Annascaul where there was a monastery.  The descendants of Owen Moriarty still reside in Ballintermon, Annascaul and many of the Moriarty families in Kerry today trace their ancestry to this branch, The Annascaul branch still keeps an ancient chalice bearing the arms of Moriarty said to be made with silver given by Queen Elizabeth. In later times Owen's descendants Timothy Moriarty (b.1774) and his son Timothy (b.1824) of Ballintermon were hereditary Seneschals or Barony Constables of Corca Dhuibhne.

References

Bibliography
 Berleth, Richard J. The Twilight Lords: Elizabeth I and the Plunder of Ireland. Rowman & Littlefield, 2002.
 Falls, Cyril. Elizabeth's Irish Wars. Constable and Company, 1996.

People of Elizabethan Ireland